The 2001 Nordic Figure Skating Championships were held from February 9th through 11th, 2001 in Odense, Denmark. The competition was open to elite figure skaters from Nordic countries. Skaters competed in two disciplines, men's singles and ladies' singles, across two levels: senior (Olympic-level) and junior.

Senior results

Men

Ladies

Junior results

Men

Ladies

External links
 2001 Nordics

Nordic Figure Skating Championships, 2001
Nordic Figure Skating Championships
International figure skating competitions hosted by Denmark
Nordic Figure Skating Championships, 2001